Tsoukatosia is a genus of gastropods belonging to the family Clausiliidae.

The species of this genus are found in Greece.

Species:

Tsoukatosia arabatzis 
Tsoukatosia argolica 
Tsoukatosia brandtstetteri 
Tsoukatosia christinae 
Tsoukatosia evauemgei 
Tsoukatosia feheri 
Tsoukatosia liae 
Tsoukatosia nicoleae 
Tsoukatosia pallgergelyi 
Tsoukatosia subaii

References

Clausiliidae